Nationality words link to articles with information on the nation's poetry or literature (for instance, Irish or France).

Events
 1308 (approx.): Dante Alighieri begins to write the Divine Comedy.

Works published

1303:
 Handlyng Synne by Robert Mannyng of Brunne, a devotional work dealing with the theory and practice of morality

1307:
 Guillaume Guiart, Branche des Royaux lignages, revised version completed

Births
Death years link to the corresponding "[year] in poetry" article. There are conflicting or unreliable sources for the birth years of many people born in this period; where sources conflict, the poet is listed again and the conflict is noted:

1300:
 Chūgan Engetsu (died 1375), Japanese poet, occupies a prominent place in Japanese Literature of the Five Mountains

1304:
 Petrarch (died 1374), Italian scholar, poet and one of the earliest Renaissance humanists

Deaths
Birth years link to the corresponding "[year] in poetry" article:

1300:
 Guido Cavalcanti (born 1255), Italian poet
 Folquet de Lunel (born 1244), troubadour from Lunel (in the modern Hérault)

1301:
 Asukai Gayu (born 1241), Japanese waka poet
 Zahed Gilani (born 1216), a Persian Sufi

1302:
 Guan Hanqing (born 1225), Chinese playwright and poet in the Yuan dynasty
 Roger-Bernard III of Foix (born 1243), the Count of Foix, poet and troubadour

1304:
 Jehan de Lescurel (born unknown), French medieval poet and composer

1308:
 Trần Nhân Tông (born 1258), Vietnamese third emperor of the Trần dynasty who was also a prolific writer and poet

See also

 Poetry
 14th century in poetry
 14th century in literature
 List of years in poetry
 Grands Rhétoriqueurs
 French Renaissance literature
 Renaissance literature
 Spanish Renaissance literature

Other events:
 Other events of the 14th century
 Other events of the 15th century

15th century:
 15th century in poetry
 15th century in literature

Notes

14th-century poetry
Poetry